Matias Habtemichael (born 14 November 1950) is an Ethiopian middle-distance runner. He competed in the men's 800 metres at the 1968 Summer Olympics.

References

External links
 

1950 births
Living people
Athletes (track and field) at the 1968 Summer Olympics
Ethiopian male middle-distance runners
Olympic athletes of Ethiopia
Athletes from Addis Ababa
20th-century Ethiopian people
21st-century Ethiopian people